Girga, alternatively Digirga or Digurga is a city in the Sohag Governorate of Upper Egypt. It is located on the west bank of the Nile River. Metropolitan see of the Coptic Orthodox Church.

Name

Some Egyptologists such as Brugsch believe that the name of the city derives from the ancient Egyptian word grg miri-amoun Ramessou which means "The establishment of Ramesses II", although Daressy and Budge identify the name with Coptic Balyana near Abydos.

Through folk etymology the city became associated with St. George and a now non-existent monastery dedicated to him nearby, hence Leo Africanus calls it Giorgia and Pest suggests an older vocalisation Gurga.

Overview
Girga was the capital of the Girga Governorate until 1960, when the capital was moved to Sohag and the name of the governorate changed accordingly. Girga has an estimated population of 71,564 (as of 1986) and has various economic industries which include cane sugar manufacturing and pottery.

History

The city was home and headquarters of the first Pharaoh of a unified Egypt, Narmer. As of today, it is unconfirmed to whether this is the site of the ancient city of This (Thinis) or the nearby village of Birba which was the capital of Egypt during the 1st and 2nd dynasties. Also neighbouring Girga is the ancient sites including Beit Khallaf, a necropolis where tourists can find mudbrick tombs dating back to the 3rd dynasty.

Girga was the capital of Upper Egypt during Ottoman rule.

In 1791, Saint Yousab El Abah (also Joseph el-Abbah) was the bishop of the city.

In 1907 Girga had a population of 19,893, of whom about one-third were Copts.

As lately as the middle of the 18th century the town stood a quarter of a mile from the river, but in the beginning of the 20th century it stood on the bank, the intervening space having been washed away, together with a large part of the town, by the stream continually encroaching on its left bank.

Places of worship

Mosques 

 Chinese Mosque

The mosque was built in the historical by a historical district of Caesaria by a Mamluk amir Muhammad bey al-Faqari in 1117. Although it is called Chinese, no materials imported from China were used in its construction and it got its name after porcelain used in its decoration.

 Osman Bey Mosque
 Al-Fuqara Mosque
 Jalal Bey Mosque
 Al-Mitwalli Mosque

Churches and monasteries 

 Monastery of Archangel Michael

Situated on the right bank of the Nile opposite of Girga. Since 1910 this site has been celebrated among archaeologists, because the discoveries made there have shed light on the region's prehistory.

 Church of Archangel Michael
 Church of Saint George
 Church of Theodore Tiron

Climate
Köppen-Geiger climate classification system classifies its climate as hot desert (BWh).

See also

 Thinis
 List of cities in Egypt

References

External links

  Girga on Wikivoyage
 Usepigraphy Stele Marble Relief - Brown University

Populated places in Sohag Governorate
Cities in Egypt